In Association football, a football club (or association football club, alternatively soccer club) is a sports club that acts as an entity through which association football teams organise their sporting activities. The club can exist either as an independent unit or as part of a larger sports organization by which it carries a parent-subsidiary stakeholdership. 

The sport of association football allows teams that partake in some sort of club activity to participate in tournaments such as leagues and other competitions. Teams must register their players as well as staff and other personnel in order to be eligible to represent the club in any activity as it regards to association football competitions. 

In association football terminology, competitions are referred to as "club competitions". Supporters may also acquire membership rights within their club. Even sponsors may be accounted for as members of the club of affiliation. This is one of the reasons why the sport came to be called association football. 

The exact requirements for club licensing are regulated by FIFA and implemented on a national level within each national member association.

The majority of association football clubs take part in a league system. These league systems are governed on a continental level by the six regional FIFA confederations. Football clubs exist all over the world on amateur, semi-professional or professional levels of the game. They can be owned by members as well as business entities.

History

Football clubs have been in practice since the 19th century, with the existence of clubs dating back to the 1850s. During the early 1860s, there were increasing attempts in England to unify and reconcile the various football games that were played in the public schools as well in the industrial north under the Sheffield Rules. Working class, industrial cities all over the U.K. began forming their own Football Associations in the late 1800s, from the Scottish Football Association in 1873 to Lancashire FA in 1878. Teams still in existence began popping up, some with the help of the Church; for example, Aston Villa was founded in 1874, Wolverhampton Wanderers in 1877, Bolton Wanderers in 1874 and Everton in 1878.

Professional football clubs

Due to the scope and popularity of the sport, professional football clubs carry a significant commercial existence, with fans expecting personal service and interactivity, and stakeholders viewing the field of professional football as a source of significant business advantages. For this reason, expensive player transfers have become an expectable part of the sport. Awards are also handed out to managers or coaches on a yearly basis for excellent performances.

The designs, logos and names of professional football clubs are often licensed trademarks. The difference between a football team and a (professional) football club is incorporation, a football club is an entity which is formed and governed by a committee and has members which may consist of supporters in addition to players.

A consequence of the FIFA rules and regulations for association football clubs is that players are not allowed to be owned by any other legal entities than the clubs themselves. This means that the involvement of external investors in the acquirement of players to the club must only involve the eventual transfer of the rights to the contract of the player in question, and not the contract itself. Contrast to other sports where regulations on player ownership generally are more loosely defined.

There are several professional football clubs that are publicly traded.

The English first division Premier League is wholly owned by its 20 participating member clubs.

Markets 

A professional football club is also a market entity as it offers a highly sought after product to an entertainment sector audience. It therefor acts as a market intermediator between its product (the football players) and its market (the supporters). In doing so, it fills a presence within a certain geographic area where football is a natural part of the culture. Football clubs may also expand their area of reach further from the local region of origin to whom they belong.

Youth systems

Many association football clubs will have either one or more youth systems connected to the organization, either as part of the club, or as an affiliate to the club. The more prestigious football clubs often have a combination of their own youth academies, as well as external sources of talent (pools) through affiliated clubs as well as the arrangement of youth tournaments.

Stadiums
Association football clubs typically have their own home ground, where they play their home games, which normally make up about half of fixtures for a given season. The home ground can either be owned by the club itself or by some other entity like a business, city or district. Clubs are often the sole event organisers of their home games.

See also

 Association football tactics
 International Federation of Association Football (FIFA)
 Forbes' list of the most valuable football clubs
 Forbes' list of the most valuable sports teams
 Lists of association football clubs
 List of women's association football clubs
 Sports club

References

External links
 FIFA Club Licensing

Further reading
Booth, Keith. The Father of Modern Sport: The Life and Times of Charles W. Alcock, Parrs Wood Press. 2002. 

Association football terminology
Association football clubs
Association football teams
Association football organizations
Event management
Sports terminology
Sports clubs